Yandina is the principal town on Mbanika Island in the Russell Islands, located on the east coast of the island, in the Central Province of Solomon Islands. It is a port, and an airport (ICAO code: AGGY, IATA code: XYA).  Yandina is the site of a copra and cocoa plantation and has basic services such as a store, post office, and rest house.

The Yandina police station was the scene of one of the opening events of the ethnic tensions, where a group of men raided the armoury and stole high powered weapons and ammunition. The group involved became known as the Guadalcanal Revolutionary Army, and later as Isatabu Freedom Movement.

Yandina is the site of one of the RAMSI posts. Yandina is also known as a diving destination.

Climate

References

Populated places in Central Province (Solomon Islands)